Department of Children and Family Services or the Department of Children and Families may refer to:

State departments:
 Connecticut Department of Children and Families
 Florida Department of Children and Families
 Department of Children and Family Services (Illinois)
 Kansas Department for Children and Families
 Department of Children and Family Services (Louisiana)
 New York State Office of Children and Family Services

County departments:
 Department of Children and Family Services (Los Angeles County)

See also
 Department of Children, Youth and Families (disambiguation)